Dobrakovo is a village in the municipality of Bijelo Polje, Montenegro. It is located at the Serbian border.

Demographics
According to the 2003 census, the village had a population of 350. Near the village, there is border crossing between Montenegro and Serbia.

According to the 2011 census, its population was 334.

References

Populated places in Bijelo Polje Municipality